Tage Pettersen  (born 25 July 1972) is a Norwegian politician. 
He was elected representative to the Storting from the constituency of Østfold for the period 2017–2021 for the Conservative Party, and re-elected for the period 2021–2025.

He was elected as president of the Norwegian Ice Hockey Association in June 2018.

References

1972 births
Living people
Conservative Party (Norway) politicians
Members of the Storting
Østfold politicians